Saint-Julien-des-Landes is a commune in the Vendée department, in the Pays de la Loire region of western France.

Geography 
The commune's municipal territory extends to 2,845 hectares. The altitude is 51 metres, and fluctuates from 7m to 66m.

In the north, it is bordered by Jaunay.

Tourism 
The commune is host to a large campsite: Camping Chateau La Forêt.

Politics

See also
Communes of the Vendée department

References

Communes of Vendée